Gagea trinervia is a Mediterranean species of small bulbous perennial plants lily family. It is found only on the Island of Sicily and in the northeastern part of Libya.

References

trinervia
Flora of Libya
Flora of Italy
Plants described in 1824